is a show on TV Asahi hosted by the character Matthew Minami (a persona of comedian Takashi Fujii). It was featured in the 2003 film Lost in Translation.

Titles

April, 2001 – March, 2002: Best Hit TV (stylized as BEST HIT TV)
April, 2002 – March, 2005: Matthew's Best Hit TV
April, 2005 – March, 2006: Matthew's Best Hit TV+
April – September, 2006: Matthew's Best Hit UV

Broadcasting times in JST (from April, 2006)

TV Asahi and Oita Asahi Broadcasting – from 1:20 a.m. until 1:50 a.m. every Friday

External links
 Matthew's Best Hit UV

2000s Japanese television series
2000 Japanese television series debuts
2006 Japanese television series endings
TV Asahi original programming
Japanese variety television shows